Bastion III "Kleparz" - is a standard reduit fortification in Kraków from the 1856-1866 period. It is part of the Kraków Fortress.

The live music venue Forty Kleparz is located here.  It features a 200-person concert hall as well as two bars.

References

Forts in Kraków
Tourist attractions in Kraków